The Battle of Mers-el-Kébir occurred in the year 1501 and was a failed attempt to capture Mers-el-Kébir by the Portuguese.

In 1501 Manuel I of Portugal dispatched a fleet larger than any expedition sent east consisting of thirty-five ships along with 3,500 men, this fleet attempted to mount an attack on Mers-el-Kébir in July. A battle took place on a beach between Oran and Mers-el-Kébir in which the Portuguese were completely defeated and suffered great losses.

References

16th century in Algeria
Battles involving Algeria
Wars involving Algeria
Battles involving Portugal
Wars involving Portugal
Zayyanid dynasty